15  is the tenth album by Ukrainian singer-songwriter Ani Lorak, released by Lavina Music.

Track listing

DVD Track listing 
 С первого взгляда
  Я с тобой

2007 albums
Ani Lorak albums
Russian-language albums